The 1935–36 Scottish Cup was the 58th staging of Scotland's most prestigious football knockout competition. The Cup was won by Rangers who defeated Third Lanark in the final.

First round
Matches played 25 January 1936.

Berwick Rangers were drawn to Celtic but worried that they would be unable to raise a team and the likelihood of difficult travel conditions decided to forfeit the tie and receive a payment of £120 from Celtic. In addition a friendly was arranged at Parkhead on 28 March between the teams with Celtic running out 6-0 winners.

Replays
Matches played between 29 January and 5 February 1936.

Second replay
Match played 3 February 1936.

Second round
Matches played 8 February 1936.

Replay
Match played 12 February 1936.

Third round
Matches played 22 February 1936.

Replays
Matches played 26 February 1936.

Quarter-finals

Matches played 7 March 1936.

Semi-finals

Final

Teams

References

External links
 Video highlights from official Pathé News archive

Scottish Cup seasons
Cup
Scot